José Ignacio Ramón Paliza Nouel (born Santo Domingo, 1 September 1981) is a politician and lawyer from the Dominican Republic. He is the President and Chairman of the Modern Revolutionary Party since 14 June 2018, and Administrative Minister of the Presidency since 16 August 2020. He was senator representing the province of Puerto Plata for the 2016–2020 period.

Early life and family 
Paliza Nouel is the son of businessman and honorary consul of Spain in Puerto Plata, Juan Ignacio Paliza García, and nephew of entrepreneurs José Manuel Paliza and Elena Viyella de Paliza. His grandfather  Benito Paliza Torre was a Spanish immigrant who was dedicated to work in the coffee industry upon his arrival to the Dominican Republic.

His mother, Grace Malvina Nouel, was born in Miami, Florida, during the period her father was Consul appointed by the dictator Rafael Trujillo for his particular adherence to him; she is the daughter of José María Nouel Simpson (son of lawyer and minister of the Interior José María Nouel Bobadilla, son of historian, lawyer and legislator Carlos Rafael Nouel Pierret and brother of archbishop and president of the Dominican Republic Adolfo Alejandro Nouel Bobadilla, and Grace Simpson Neumann, the daughter of Thomas Simpson, the United States consul in Puerto Plata from 1884 to 1905), and Ligia Malvina Henríquez Mon. On his mother's side, he descends from President Tomás Bobadilla, the first ruler of the Dominican Republic; Paliza Nouel is great-grandnephew of monsignor Adolfo Alejandro Nouel.

In 2003, he earned a doctorate in law (magna cum laude), at Universidad Iberoamericana (UNIBE);  he studied International Studies of Law, Business and Public Policy, and Public Finance Management, at Georgetown, Pennsylvania and Harvard, respectively..

Ancestry
Paliza's maternal family was a notable elite family in the Dominican Republic. His ancestors includes Presidents, Senators, Ministers and Consuls.

Politics 
He was elected with just 28 years as a deputy to the 2010–2016 legislature, and was the youngest member of the Congress of the Dominican Republic.

In his 2010 sworn statement of assets, Paliza stated that he had a negative equity, as he owed RD$ 5 million (US$ 135,000) to his father (who died in 2014). In 2016 he reported to have RD$ 13.38 million (US$ 291,000) in assets. In 2020, Paliza's net worth rose to RD$ 23.08 million (US$ 395,000).

In August 2014, along with more than thirty deputies defectors he entered into the Modern Revolutionary Party (PRM), following a split in the Dominican Revolutionary Party (PRD).

Paliza was elected President and Chairman of the Modern Revolutionary Party in the primary elections held on 18 March 2018, he took office on 14 June 2018.

References

External links 

FÉLIZ, Iván (14 April 2013). «Diputado dice durante sesión que se avergüenza de ser legislador». El Caribe.

Living people
1981 births
People from Santo Domingo
Dominican Republic people of Breton descent
Dominican Republic people of British descent
Dominican Republic people of Dutch-Jewish descent
Dominican Republic people of Jewish descent
Dominican Republic people of European American descent
Dominican Republic people of French descent
Dominican Republic people of German descent
Dominican Republic people of Portuguese descent
Dominican Republic people of Spanish descent
University of Pennsylvania alumni
Georgetown University alumni
Harvard Business School alumni
Universidad Iberoamericana (UNIBE) alumni
21st-century Dominican Republic lawyers
Dominican Republic politicians
Dominican Revolutionary Party politicians
Modern Revolutionary Party politicians
Government ministers of the Dominican Republic
Members of the Chamber of Deputies of the Dominican Republic
Members of the Senate of the Dominican Republic
Presidents of political parties in the Dominican Republic
White Dominicans